DNA damage-inducible transcript 3, also known as C/EBP homologous protein (CHOP), is a pro-apoptotic transcription factor that is encoded by the DDIT3 gene.  It is a member of the CCAAT/enhancer-binding protein (C/EBP) family of DNA-binding transcription factors.  The protein functions as a dominant-negative inhibitor by forming heterodimers with other C/EBP members, preventing their DNA binding activity. The protein is implicated in adipogenesis and erythropoiesis and has an important role in the cell's stress response.

Structure 
C/EBP proteins are known to have a conserved C-terminal structure, basic leucine zipper domain(bZIP), that is necessary for the formation of DNA-binding capable homodimers or heterodimers with other proteins or members of the C/EBP protein family.  CHOP is a relatively small (29kDa) protein that differs from most C/EBP proteins in several amino acid substitutions, which impacts its DNA-binding ability.

Regulation and function 
Due to a variety of upstream and downstream regulatory interactions, CHOP plays an important role in ER stress-induced apoptosis caused by a variety of stimuli such as pathogenic microbial or viral infections, amino acid starvation, mitochondrial stress, neurological diseases, and neoplastic diseases.

Under normal physiological conditions, CHOP is ubiquitously present at very low levels.  However, under overwhelming ER stress conditions, the expression of CHOP rises sharply along with the activation of apoptotic pathways in a wide variety of cells.  Those processes are mainly regulated by three factors: protein kinase RNA-like endoplasmic reticulum kinase (PERK), activating transcription factor 6 (ATF6), and inositol requiring protein 1 (IRE1α)

Upstream regulatory pathways 
During ER stress, CHOP is mainly induced via activation of the integrated stress response pathways through the subsequent downstream phosphorylation of a translation initiation factor, eukaryotic initiation factor 2α (eIF2α), and induction of a transcription factor, activation transcription factor 4 (ATF4), which converges on the promoters of target genes, including CHOP.

Integrated stress response, and thus CHOP expression, can be induced by

 amino acid starvation through general control non-derepressible-2 (GCN2)
 viral infection through the vertebrate-specific kinases - double-stranded RNA-activated protein kinase (PKR)
 iron deficiency through heme-regulated inhibitor kinase (HRI)
 stress from accumulation of unfolded or misfolded proteins in the ER activates the integrated stress response through protein kinase RNA-like endoplasmic reticulum kinase (PERK).

Under ER stress, activated transmembrane protein ATF6 translocates to the nucleus and interacts with ATF/cAMP response elements and ER stress-response elements, binding the promoters and inducing transcription of several genes involved in unfolded protein response (including CHOP, XBP1 and others). Thus, ATF6 activates the transcription of both CHOP and XBP-1, while XBP-1 can also upregulate the expression of CHOP.

ER stress also stimulates transmembrane protein IRE1α activity. Upon activation, IRE1α splices the XBP-1 mRNA introns to produce a mature and active XBP-1 protein, that upregulates CHOP expression IRE1α  also stimulates the activation of the apoptotic-signaling kinase-1 (ASK1), which then activates the downstream kinases, Jun-N-terminal kinase (JNK) and p38 mitogen-activated protein kinase (p38 MAPK), which participate in apoptosis induction along with CHOP. The P38 MAP kinase family phosphorylates Ser78 and Ser81 of CHOP, which induces cell apoptosis. Moreover, research studies found that the JNK inhibitors can suppress CHOP upregulation, indicating that JNK activation is also involved in the modulation of CHOP levels.

Downstream pathways

Apoptosis induction via Mitochondria-Dependent Pathway 
As a transcription factor, CHOP can regulate the expression of many anti-apoptotic and pro-apoptotic genes, including genes encoding the BCL2-family proteins, GADD34 and TRB-3. In the CHOP-induced apoptotic pathway, CHOP regulates the expression of BCL2 protein family, that includes anti-apoptotic proteins (BCL2, BCL-XL, MCL-1, and BCL-W) and pro-apoptotic proteins (BAK, BAX,  BOK, BIM, PUMA and others).

Under ER stress, CHOP can function as either a transcriptional activator or repressor. It forms heterodimers with other C/EBP family transcription factors via bZIP-domain interactions to inhibit the expression of genes responsive to C/EBP family transcription factors, while enhancing the expression of other genes containing a specific 12–14 bp DNA cis-acting element. CHOP can downregulate the expressions of anti-apoptotic BCL2 proteins, and upregulate the expression of proapoptotic proteins (BIM,  BAK and BAX expression). BAX-BAK oligomerization causes cytochrome c and apoptosis-inducing factor (AIF) release from mitochondria, eventually causing cell death.

TRB3 pseudokinase  is upregulated by the ER stress-inducible transcriptional factor, ATF4-CHOP. CHOP interacts with TRB3, which contributes to the induction of apoptosis. The expression of TRB3 has a pro-apoptotic capacity. Therefore, CHOP also regulates apoptosis by upregulating the expression of the TRB3 gene.

Apoptosis induction via Death-Receptor Pathway 
Death receptor-mediated apoptosis occurs via activation of death ligands (Fas, TNF, and TRAIL) and death receptors. Upon activation, the receptor protein, Fas-associated death domain protein, forms death-inducing signaling complex, which activates the downstream caspase cascade to induce apoptosis.

The PERK-ATF4-CHOP pathway can induce apoptosis by binding to the death receptors and upregulating the expression of death receptor 4 (DR4) and DR5. CHOP also interacts with the phosphorylated transcription factor JUN to form a complex that binds to the promoter region of DR4 in lung cancer cells. The N-terminal domain of CHOP interacts with phosphorylated JUN to form a complex that regulates the expression of DR4 and DR5. CHOP also upregulates the expression of DR5 by binding to the 5′-region of the DR5 gene.

Under prolonged ER stress conditions, activation of the PERK-CHOP pathway will permit DR5 protein levels to rise, which accelerates the formation of the death-inducing signaling complex (DISC) and activates caspase-8, leading to apoptosis

Apoptosis induction through other downstream pathways 
In addition, CHOP also mediates apoptosis through increasing the expression of the ERO1α (ER reductase) gene, which catalyzes the production of H2O2 in the ER. The highly oxidized state of the ER results in H2O2 leakage into the cytoplasm, inducing the production of reactive oxygen species (ROS) and a series of apoptotic and inflammatory reactions.

The overexpression of CHOP can lead to cell cycle arrest and result in cell apoptosis. At the same time, CHOP-induced apoptosis can also trigger cell death by inhibiting the expression of cell cycle regulatory protein, p21. The p21 protein inhibits the G1 phase of the cell cycle as well as regulates the activity of pre-apoptotic factors. Identified CHOP-p21 relationship may play a role in changing the cell state from adapting to ER stress towards pre-apoptotic activity.

Under most conditions, CHOP can directly bind to the promoters of downstream related genes. However, under specific condition, CHOP can cooperate with other transcription factors to affect apoptosis. Recent studies have shown that Bcl-2-associated athanogene 5 (Bag5) is over-expressed in prostate cancer and inhibits ER stress-induced apoptosis. Overexpression of Bag5 results in decreased CHOP and BAX expression, and increased Bcl-2 gene expression. Bag5 overexpression inhibited ER stress-induced apoptosis in the unfolded protein response by suppressing PERK-eIF2-ATF4 and enhancing the IRE1-Xbp1 activity.

In general, the downstream targets of CHOP regulate the activation of apoptotic pathways, however, the molecular interaction mechanisms behind those processes remain to be discovered.

Interactions 

DNA damage-inducible transcript 3 has been shown to interact with [proteins]:

 ATF3, 
 C-Fos,
 C-jun and 
 CEBPB, 
 CSNK2A1, 
 JunD,  and
 RPS3A.

Clinical significance

Role in fatty liver and hyperinsulinemia 

Chop gene deletion has been demonstrated protective against diet induced metabolic syndromes in mice. Mice with germline Chop gene knockout have better glycemic control despite of unchanged obesity. A plausible explanation for the observed dissociation between obesity and insulin resistance is that CHOP promotes insulin hypersecretion from pancreatic β cells.

Furthermore, Chop depletion by a GLP1-ASO delievery system was shown to have therapeutic effects of insulin reduction and fatty liver correction, in preclinical mouse models.

Role in microbial infection 
CHOP-induced apoptosis pathways had been identified in cells infected by

 Porcine circovirus type 2 (PERK-eIF2α-ATF4 -CHOP-BCL2 pathway)
 HIV (XBP-1-CHOP-Caspase 3/9 pathway)
 Infectious bronchitis virus (PERK-eIF2α-ATF4/PKR-eIF2α-ATF4 pathway)
 M. tuberculosis (PERK-eIF2α-CHOP pathway)
 Helicobacter pylori (PERK-CHOP or PKR-eIF2α-ATF4 pathway)
 Escherichia coli (CHOP-DR5-Caspase 3/8 pathway)
 Shigella dysenteriae (p38-CHOP-DR5 pathway)

Since CHOP has an important role of apoptosis induction during infection, it is an important target for further research that will help deepen the current understanding of pathogenesis and potentially provide an opportunity for invention of new therapeutic approaches. For example, small molecule inhibitors of CHOP expression may act as therapeutic options to prevent ER stress and microbial infections. Research had shown that small molecule inhibitors of PERK-eIF2α pathway limit PCV2 virus replication.

Role in other diseases 
The regulation of CHOP expression plays an important role in metabolic diseases and in some cancers through its function in mediating apoptosis. The regulation of CHOP expression could be a potential approach to affecting cancer cells through the induction of apoptosis. In the intestinal epithelium, CHOP has been demonstrated to be downregulated under inflammatory conditions (in inflammatory bowel diseases and experimental models of colitis). In this context, CHOP seems to rather regulate the cell cycle than apoptotic processes.

Mutations or fusions of CHOP (e.g. with FUS to form FUS-CHOP) can cause Myxoid liposarcoma.

References

Further reading

External links 
 

Transcription factors
Oncogenes